The Unitarian Church of All Souls at 1157 Lexington Avenue at East 80th Street in the Upper East Side of Manhattan, New York City was built in 1932 and was designed by Hobart Upjohn – Richard Upjohn's grandson – in the Neo-colonial style with a Regency-influenced brick base.   It is the congregation's fourth sanctuary. The congregation, dating back to 1819, was the first Unitarian Universalist congregation in the city. It has provided a pulpit for some of the movement's leading theologians and has also recorded many eminent persons in its membership.

History
All Souls was the first Unitarian congregation to be organized in New York and originated in 1819 when Lucy Channing Russell invited forty friends and neighbors into her Lower Manhattan home, to listen to an address by her brother, William Ellery Channing, the minister of the Federal Street Church in Boston.  Channing was making a stop in New York while traveling to Baltimore to preach the famous sermon in which he would articulate the distinctive tenets of Unitarian Christianity, the most salient of which were the rejection of the Trinity in favor of absolute Monotheism, and the imperative to interpret the Bible through reason.  In New York, the enthusiasm aroused by Channing culminated in the formation of the First Congregational Church (Unitarian), which proceeded to erect its first building in 1820-21, on Chambers Street between Church Street and Chapel Street, before it had even found a minister.  The task of recruitment was difficult since few ministers could be persuaded to venture away from the stability of the Unitarian heartland in New England and risk their careers in new congregations beyond.  Finally, on December 18, 1821, William Ware was installed as the first minister.

In 1845, the congregation moved to a new building at 548 Broadway and renamed itself the Church of the Divine Unity the following year. In 1855, the present name, All Souls, was taken by an American church for the first time when the congregation dedicated its third building, at 249 Fourth Avenue (now Park Avenue South) at 20th Street. The new church was designed by Jacob Wrey Mould and featured bands of red and white bricks and Caen stone, which led to the colloquial names of "The Holy Zebra" and "The Beefsteak Church."

In partnership with minister Henry Whitney Bellows, who served for over four decades from 1839 to 1882, All Souls grew to include some of the leading social reformers and cultural figures of the city, such as Peter Cooper, Herman Melville, and others. One noted member was the novelist Catharine Sedgwick, who remarked upon the diverse backgrounds of the people who were attracted to the freedom of ethical inquiry which All Souls offered: "strangers from inland and outland, English radicals and daughters of Erin, Germans and Hollanders, philosophic gentiles and unbelieving Jews . . . In this, our ass'n, there is at least one of every sort."  In evolving from its roots in Unitarian Christianity, All Souls has embraced an enlarging religious pluralism that continues to this day.

All Souls relocated to its current building on the Upper East Side at 1157 Lexington Avenue at 80th Street in 1932, designed by Richard Upjohn's grandson, Hobart Upjohn, in the Colonial Revival style with a Regency-influenced base. Forrest Church, the prolific author and theologian, then served as Senior Minister for almost thirty years until the beginning of 2007, when, due to terminal cancer, he was succeeded by Galen Guengerich and assumed the less strenuous duties of Minister of Public Theology.  Church's charismatic style has been credited with the revitalization of the congregation.

Notable members
George Fisher Baker, financier, philanthropist
William Cullen Bryant, poet, journalist
Peter Cooper industrialist, philanthropist (founder of Cooper Union)
Nathaniel Currier, lithographer, co-founder of Currier and Ives
Dorman Bridgman Eaton, lawyer, civil service reformer
Caroline Kirkland, writer
Herman Melville, writer
Laura Pedersen, author, journalist, playwright, humorist
Louisa Lee Schuyler, Sanitary Commission organizer, founder of America's first nursing school at Bellevue Hospital
Catharine Sedgwick, writer

See also
 Transcendentalism

References
Notes

Further reading
"Unitarian Church of All Souls," The New York City Organ Project, The New York City Chapter of the American Guild of Organists
Kring, Walter Donald. History of the Unitarian Church of All Souls in New York City in 3 vols.
Liberals Among the Orthodox: Unitarian Beginnings in New York City, 1819-1839 (Boston: Beacon Press, 1974)
Henry Whitney Bellows (Boston: Skinner House, 1979)
Safely Onward (New York: Unitarian Church of All Souls, 1991)

External links

Official Church website

Churches in Manhattan
Unitarian Universalist churches in New York City
Upper East Side
Churches completed in 1932
20th-century Unitarian Universalist church buildings
1819 establishments in New York (state)
Religious organizations established in 1819